John-Ross Christopher Edwards (born 27 January 1988) is a Jamaican former footballer who played for Harbour View and the Jamaican national team, as a midfielder.

References

1988 births
Living people
Jamaican footballers
Jamaica international footballers
Harbour View F.C. players
National Premier League players
Association football midfielders